Michel Carré (20 October 1821, Besançon – 27 June 1872, Argenteuil) was a prolific French librettist.

He went to Paris in 1840 intending to become a painter but took up writing instead. He wrote verse and plays before turning to writing libretti. He wrote the text for Charles Gounod's Mireille (1864) on his own, and collaborated with Eugène Cormon on Bizet's Les pêcheurs de perles. However, the majority of his libretti were completed in tandem with Jules Barbier, with whom he wrote the libretti for numerous operas, including Camille Saint-Saëns's Le timbre d'argent (libretto written in 1864, first performed in 1877), Gounod's Faust (1859), Roméo et Juliette (1867), and Offenbach's Les contes d'Hoffmann (1881). As with the other libretti by Barbier and himself, these were adaptations of existing literary masterworks.

His son, Michel-Antoine (1865–1945), followed in his father's footsteps, also writing libretti, and later directing silent films. His nephew Albert Carré (1852–1938) also wrote libretti.

List of works with libretti by Michel Carré

Sources 
 Christopher Smith: "Carré, Michel", Grove Music Online ed. L. Macy (Accessed 4 December 2005)

External links

1821 births
1872 deaths
French opera librettists
Writers from Besançon
19th-century French dramatists and playwrights